A plant canker is a small area of dead tissue, which grows slowly, often over years. Some cankers are of only minor consequence, but others are ultimately lethal and therefore can have major economic implications for agriculture and horticulture. Their causes include a wide range of organisms as fungi, bacteria, mycoplasmas and viruses.  The majority of canker-causing organisms are bound to a unique host species or genus, but a few will attack other plants. Weather and animals can spread canker, thereby endangering areas that have only slight amount of canker.

Although fungicides or bactericides can treat some cankers, often the only available treatment is to destroy the infected plant to contain the disease.

Examples

 Apple canker, caused by the fungus Neonectria galligena
 Ash bacterial canker, now understood to be caused by the bacterium Pseudomonas savastanoi, rather than Pseudomonas syringae. After DNA-relatedness studies Pseudomonas savastanoi has been instated as a new species.
 Butternut canker, caused by the fungus Sirococcus clavigignenti-juglandacearum
 Bleeding canker of horse chestnut, caused by the bacterium Pseudomonas syringae pv. aesculi
 Citrus canker, caused by the bacterium Xanthomonas axonopodis
 Cypress canker, caused by the fungus Seiridium cardinale
 Foamy bark canker of oaks in California, caused by the fungus Geosmithia putterillii
 Dogwood anthracnose, caused by the fungus Discula destructiva
 Grape canker, caused by the fungus Eutypa lata
 Honey locust canker, caused by the fungus Thyronectria austro-americana
 Larch canker, caused by the fungus Lachnellula willkommii
 Mulberry canker, caused by the fungus Gibberella baccata
 Oak canker, caused by the fungus Diplodia quercina
 Pine pitch canker, caused by the fungus Fusarium circinatum
 Plane anthracnose, caused by the fungus Apiognomonia veneta
 Poplar canker, caused by the bacterium Xanthomonas populi
 Rapeseed stem canker, caused by the blackleg fungus Leptosphaeria maculans
 Rose cankers, caused by the fungus Leptosphaeria coniothyrium and Cryptosporella umbrina
 Scleroderris canker, caused by the fungus Gremmeniella abietina
 Southwest canker, caused by environmental conditions (cold and sun)
 Tomato anthracnose, caused by the fungus Colletotrichum coccodes
 Willow anthracnose, caused by the fungus Marssonina salicicola

See also
 Forest pathology
 Burl or Burr

References

External links

  Canker Diseases of Trees

Plant pathogens and diseases